Öberg is a Swedish surname. Notable people with the surname include:

Andreas Öberg, (born 1978), Swedish guitar musician
Brita Öberg (1900–1969), Swedish actress
Carl-Göran Öberg (born 1938), Swedish ice hockey player
Charlotta Öberg (1818–1856), Swedish poet
Elvira Öberg (born 1999), Swedish biathlete
Karin Öberg (born 1982), Swedish astrochemist
Maria Öberg (born 1966), Swedish Social Democratic politician
Per Öberg  (born 1962), Swedish handball player 
Peter Öberg (ice hockey) (born 1982), Swedish ice hockey player
Peter Öberg (orienteer) (born 1980), Swedish orienteering competitor 
Prawitz Öberg (1930-1995), Swedish footballer 
Rune Öberg (1922-2002), Swedish water polo player
Sigfrid Öberg (1907–1949), Swedish ice hockey player
Thomas Öberg (singer) (born 1967), Swedish musician

See also

 Oberg

Swedish-language surnames